James Hardy (born December 5, 1981) is an American football coach.

Hardy coached at the collegiate level for over a decade before becoming part of the Patriots' staff in 2015 as an assistant strength and conditioning coach. On February 5, 2017, Hardy was part of the Patriots coaching staff that won Super Bowl LI. In the game, the Patriots defeated the Atlanta Falcons by a score of 34–28 in overtime.

References

External links 
 New England Patriots bio

1981 births
Living people
Auburn Tigers football coaches
Colorado Buffaloes football coaches
Colorado Buffaloes men's basketball coaches
New England Patriots coaches
Players of American football from Virginia